The short posterior ciliary arteries are a number of branches of the ophthalmic artery. They pass forward with the optic nerve to reach the eyeball, piercing the sclera around the entry of the optic nerve into the eyeball.

Anatomy 
The number of short posterior ciliary arteries varies between individuals; one or more short posterior ciliary arteries initially branch off the ophthalmic artery, subsequently dividing to form up to 20 short posterior ciliary arteries.

Origin 
The short posterior ciliary arteries branch off the ophthalmic artery as it crosses the optic nerve medially.

Course and relations 
About 7 short posterior ciliary arteries accompany the optic nerve, passing anterior-ward to reach the posterior part of the eyeball, where they divide into 15-20 branches and pierce the sclera around the entrance of the optic nerve.

Distribution 
The short posterior ciliary arteries contribute arterial supply to the choroid, ciliary processes, optic disc, the outer retina, and Bruch's membrane.

Some branches of the short posterior ciliary arteries supply the optic disc by means of an anastomotic ring - the circle of Zinn-Haller or circle of Zinn - which is associated with the fibrous extension of the ocular tendons (common tendinous ring (also annulus of Zinn)).

Additional images

See also
 Long posterior ciliary arteries
Anterior ciliary arteries

References

Arteries of the head and neck